The 1961 Utah State Aggies football team represented the Utah State University in the 1961 NCAA University Division football season.

Schedule

References

External links
Game program: Utah State vs. Washington State at Spokane – September 30, 1961

Utah State
Utah State Aggies football seasons
Mountain States Conference football champion seasons
Utah State Aggies football